The leaden labeo (Labeo molybdinus) is an African freshwater fish in family Cyprinidae. It is found in southern Africa from the Limpopo River, Incomati River, Usutu River, Tugela River, and the Zambezi River systems.

References 

Labeo
Cyprinid fish of Africa
Fish of Botswana
Fish of Mozambique
Fish of South Africa
Fish of Eswatini
Fish of Zambia
Fish of Zimbabwe
Fish described in 1963